Dudley Joseph LeBlanc (August 16, 1894 – October 22, 1971) was an American entrepreneur and politician. He created the patent medicine Hadacol and promoted it through the 'Hadacol Caravan' which featured major celebrities of the day including Mickey Rooney, Ava Gardner, Cesar Romero, Hank Williams, and many others. Williams began writing the song 'Jambalaya' while traveling on the Hadacol bus, listening to the Cajun conversation.

Leblanc served in the Louisiana House of Representatives from 1924 to 1928. In 1932 he ran for governor, losing to the Huey Long candidate Oscar K. Allen. He served in the Louisiana Senate from 1940 to 1944, 1948 to 1952, and 1964 to 1972.

In his gubernatorial campaign, one of Leblanc's planks was to pay a monthly stipend to the elderly.  Huey Long subsequently adopted the idea in his nascent campaign for President. Franklin D. Roosevelt got the idea from Long, and it became the modern Social Security system.

LeBlanc can be seen as a contestant on the 1st March 1951 edition of You Bet Your Life in which he describes his political career.

He was posthumously inducted into the Louisiana Political Museum and Hall of Fame in 1993.

References

 William J. "Bill" Dodd, Peapatch Politics: The Earl Long Era in Louisiana Politics, Baton Rouge: Claitor's Publishing, 1991
 Obituaries of Dudley J. LeBlanc, Baton Rouge Morning Advocate, October 23, 1971; Lafayette Daily Advertiser October 22, 1971; New Orleans Times-Picayune, October 23, 1971
 https://web.archive.org/web/20060715210804/http://www.sec.state.la.us/archives/leblanc/leblanc-1.htm
 Floyd Clay Martin, Coozan Dudley LeBlanc: From Huey Long to Hadacol
 http://www.alibris.com/search/search.cfm?S=R&qwork=1336975&qsort=p&siteID=KLVmR9fE2yU-LcsUdqTmR6Odz.nkB9F.IA
 http://www.acadian.org/leblanc.html
 http://www.lpb.org/education/classroom/itv/serdesc.cfm?SerID=15
 M. M. Le Blanc, The True Story of the Acadians, 90th Anniversary Edition,  BizEntine Press.
 M. M. Le Blanc, The Acadian Miracle, 50th Anniversary Edition, BizEntine Press.

1894 births
1971 deaths
People from Abbeville, Louisiana
People from Erath, Louisiana
People from Youngsville, Louisiana
20th-century American politicians
Acadian history
Burials in Louisiana
Businesspeople from Louisiana
Cajun people
Democratic Party Louisiana state senators
Democratic Party members of the Louisiana House of Representatives
Members of the Louisiana Public Service Commission
Patent medicine businesspeople
Politicians from Lafayette, Louisiana
University of Louisiana at Lafayette alumni
20th-century American businesspeople